The Women's Minor League Basketball Association (WMLBA) was a women's professional basketball league in North America. It was initially founded in 2016, although the initial playing season began in 2017. The season ran from June through August.

History 
In 2015, Janell Burse and Kre’Tonia Morgan formed the Women's Minor League Basketball Association. Burse acted as the WMLBA Commissioner. The Louisiana native played four years for Tulane University before her pro career with the Minnesota Lynx and Seattle Storm of the WNBA, and Wisla Can-Pack Kraków in Poland. A native of Mississippi, Morgan was the President of Business Operations.

The league initially planned to begin play in 2016, but the first season of competition was in 2017. The regular season began in June culminating in a championship game in August between the Tennessee Storm and the Dallas Lightning, won by Dallas 76–71.

The league announced on January 3, 2020, that it was ceasing operations.

Teams

Former member teams 

Fort Worth Elite (2018)
Midwest Reign (2017)

Champions

References

External links 
Women's Minor League Basketball Association Twitter
Women's basketball leagues in the United States
Sports leagues established in 2016
Professional sports leagues in the United States